Couronne was a  74-gun ship of the line of the French Navy.

Career 
Couronne was one of the ships built in the various shipyards captured by the First French Empire in Holland and Italy in a crash programme to replenish the ranks of the French Navy.

The Dutch seized Couronne when the French evacuated Amsterdam on 14 November 1813 and commissioned her as Willem de Eerste. She was decommissioned in 1829.

Notes, citations, and references

Notes

Citations

References
 

Ships of the line of the French Navy
Téméraire-class ships of the line
1813 ships